In baseball statistics, on-base percentage (OBP) is a measure of how often a batter reaches base for any reason other than a fielding error, fielder's choice, dropped or uncaught third strike, fielder's obstruction, or catcher's interference. OBP is calculated in Major League Baseball (MLB) by dividing the sum of hits, walks, and times hit by a pitch by the sum of at-bats, walks, times hit by pitch and sacrifice flies. A hitter with a .400 on-base percentage is considered to be great and rare; only 61 players in MLB history with at least 3,000 career plate appearances (PA) have maintained such an OBP. Left fielder Ted Williams, who played 19 seasons for the Boston Red Sox, has the highest career on-base percentage, .4817, in MLB history. Williams led the American League (AL) in on-base percentage in twelve seasons, the most such seasons for any player in the major leagues. Barry Bonds led the National League (NL) in ten seasons, a NL record. Williams also posted the then-highest single-season on-base percentage of .5528 in 1941, a record that stood for 61 years until Bonds broke it with a .5817 OBP in 2002. Bonds broke his own record in 2004, setting the current single-season mark of .6094.

Players are eligible for the Hall of Fame if they have played at least 10 major league seasons, have been either retired for five seasons or deceased for six months, and have not been banned from MLB. These requirements leave 6 living players ineligible who have played in the past 5 seasons; 5 players (Bill Joyce, Ferris Fain, Jake Stenzel, Bill Lange, and George Selkirk) who did not play 10 seasons in MLB; and Shoeless Joe Jackson, who was banned for his role in the Black Sox Scandal.

Key

List

Stats updated as of the end of the 2022 season.

See also

List of Major League Baseball career batting average leaders
List of Major League Baseball career slugging percentage leaders
List of Major League Baseball career OPS leaders

Notes

References

External links

On-base
Major League Baseball statistics